The 1910–11 season was Chelsea Football Club's sixth competitive season and sixth year in existence. The club finished 3rd in the Second Division, narrowly missing out on promotion back to the First Division. They also reached an FA Cup semi-final for the first time, losing 3–0 to Newcastle United.

Table

References

External links
 1910–11 season at stamford-bridge.com

1910–11
English football clubs 1910–11 season